Carlo Mirabello was one of three s built for the  (Royal Italian Navy) during World War I.

Design and description
The ships were designed as scout cruisers (esploratori), essentially enlarged versions of contemporary destroyers. Their complement was 8 officers and 161 enlisted men.

The Mirabellos were powered by two Parsons geared steam turbines, each driving one propeller shaft using steam supplied by four Yarrow boilers.

Their main battery consisted of eight Cannone da /35 S Modello 1914 guns in single mounts protected by gun shields, one each fore and aft of the superstructure on the centerline and the remaining guns positioned on the broadside amidships. Carlo Mirabello exchanged a Cannone da /40 A Modello 1891 for the forward 102 mm gun; Carlo Mirabello received hers in 1917. The gun proved to be too heavy for the ships and its rate of fire was too slow. Anti-aircraft (AA) defense for the Mirabello-class ships was provided by a pair of 40-caliber Cannone da /40 Modello 1916 AA guns in single mounts. They were equipped with four  torpedo tubes in two twin mounts, one on each broadside. The ship could also carry 100 mines.

Modifications
The 152 mm gun proved to be too heavy for the ships and its rate of fire was too slow so it was replaced when the Mirabello-class ships were rearmed with eight 45-caliber Cannone da 102/45 S, A Modello 1917 guns arranged as per Carlo Mirabellos original configuration in 1919. The 76 mm guns were replaced by a pair of 39-caliber Cannone da /39 AA guns in single mounts in 1920–1922.

Citations

Bibliography

External links
 Carlo Mirabello Marina Militare website

Mirabello-class destroyers
Ships built in Genoa
Ships built by Gio. Ansaldo & C.
1915 ships
World War II destroyers of Italy
Maritime incidents in May 1941
Ships sunk by mines